Uke in Idemili North (Anambra) is a town in Eastern Nigeria about 208 mi (or 334 km) south of Abuja, the country's capital city.

It is made up of six villages (brothers): Ubulenu-Ezema, Uruabor, Oba, Umunnakwe-Omimi, Umuazu and Nkwelle.
It has a very popular market known as Eke Uke, which is situated in the middle of the villages.

Notable People: Obi Ezeude founder and CEO of Beloxxi Nigeria, Chief Sir Tochukwu Kpajie (Okunaenyeife) CEO STK Industries, Chief Ikechukwu Okosa, (Ijele) Uke,
Barr S.N.S Eze (Ezekwesili), Surv. Emeka Enendu, Chief Ikedi Obi (Obataifeadi), Dr Edwin Emegoakor (Odu Uke)

The traditional head is elected  on the demise of the previous traditional leader, and it is rotated round the six villages.

The current traditional ruler is Igwe Charles Chuma Agbala Igwe Oranyelu III. His predecessors are Igwe GNC Ezeude Igwe Oranyelu II, Igwe WI Ileka Igwe Oranyelu I.

The town is host to the Holy Ghost Adoration Ministry whose Spiritual Director Rev.Fr. Emmanuel Obimma

The local time zone is named Africa / Lagos with an UTC offset of one hour. There are 8 airports near Uke. The closest airport in Nigeria is Anambra International Cargo Airport Umueri.

https://www.absradiotv.com/2020/04/26/igwe-agbala-distributes-food-items-to-over-500-indigent-persons-in-uke-community-idemili-north-council-area/

https://www.vanguardngr.com/2018/10/anambra-uke-community-mired-in-succession-constitutional-squabble/amp/

References

Populated places in Anambra State